The 57th Ariel Awards ceremony, organized by the Mexican Academy of Film Arts and Sciences (AMACC) took place on May 27, 2015, in Mexico City. During the ceremony, AMACC presented the Ariel Award in 25 categories honoring films released in 2014. Güeros received five awards out of 12 nominations, including Best Picture and Best Director for Alonso Ruizpalacios. Cantinflas, Obediencia Perfecta, and Las Oscuras Primaveras followed with three awards; La Tirisia and Visitantes with two; and Seguir Viviendo, Relatos Salvajes, H20MX, El Penacho de Moctezuma. Plumaria del México Antiguo, El Modelo de Pickman and Ramona with one.

Awards
Winners will be listed first and highlighted with boldface.

Special awards
Golden Ariel – Bertha Navarro
Special Silver Ariel – Miguel Vázquez
Special recognition – José Emilio Pacheco, Gabriel García Márquez, and Vicente Leñero

Multiple nominations and awards

The following sixteen films received multiple nominations:

Films that received multiple awards:

References

Ariel Awards ceremonies
2015 film awards
2015 in Mexican cinema